The Utah Academic Library Consortium (UALC) is an organization of Utah libraries of not-for-profit educational and research universities and institutions. UALC was established in 1971 to improve the availability and delivery of information services to the higher education community and the State of Utah. It was formed to maximize state resources, foster research, and advocate for excellent library resources.

In 2001, members of the Utah Academic Library Consortium founded the Mountain West Digital Library, a digital library aggregator for memory institutions in the Mountain West. Since 2013, the Mountain West Digital Library has been the regional service hub for the Digital Public Library of America for the Mountain West, sending over 900,000 items to the national digital library.

Member Libraries
Brigham Young University, Harold B. Lee Library
Brigham Young University, Howard W. Hunter Law Library
The Church of Jesus Christ of Latter-day Saints, Church History Library
Dixie State University Library
Salt Lake Community College Libraries
Snow College, Karen H. Huntsman Library
Southern Utah University, Gerald R. Sherratt Library
University of Utah, J. Willard Marriott Library
University of Utah, Spencer S. Eccles Health Sciences Library
University of Utah, S.J. Quinney Law Library
Utah State Library
Utah State University, Merrill-Cazier Library
Utah Valley University Library
Weber State University, Stewart Library
Westminster College, Giovale Library

References

External links 

 Official website

1971 establishments in Utah
Library consortia in Utah
Organizations established in 1971